Air fluid levels  may refer to:

 Bowel obstruction
 Hydropneumothorax, both air and liquid around the lungs
 Waters' view, a type of head X-ray that can show air fluid levels in the sinuses